Christine Selinger is a Canadian paracanoeist who has competed since the late 2000s. She won her first international medal at the 2009 ICF Canoe Sprint World Championships, then subsequently won two medals at the 2010 ICF Canoe Sprint World Championships in Poznań with a gold in the V-1 200 m LTA and a silver in the K-1 200 m TA events. At the 2011 ICF Canoe Sprint World Championships in Szeged she repeated her 2010 performance with a gold in the V-1 200m LTA and a second-place finish in the K-1 200m TA event.

Christine Selinger is also an adventure enthusiast who became the first paraplegic to traverse the Nootka Trail (located on Nootka Island in British Columbia, Canada) in May 2010.  The expedition was referred to in the media as "Nootka No Limits".

Selinger became a paraplegic in late 2006 after a rappelling incident in Savona, BC.

References

2011 ICF Canoe Sprint World Championships women's V-1 200 m LTA results. - accessed 21 November 2011
2011 ICF Canoe Sprint World Championships women's K-1 200 m TA results. - accessed 21 November 2011
2010 ICF Canoe Sprint World Championships women's K-1 200 m TA results. - accessed 20 August 2010.
2010 ICF Canoe Sprint World Championships women's V-1 200 m LTA, TA, A results. - accessed 20 August 2010.
Nootka No Limits Expedition. - accessed 21 November 2011
2009 ICF Sprint World Championships K2 TA,A Mixed 200m results. accessed 9 November 2010
2012 ParaCanoe World Championships results - accessed 12 August 2012

Canadian female canoeists
Living people
1987 births
ICF Canoe Sprint World Championships medalists in paracanoe
Paracanoeists of Canada
TA classification paracanoeists